At the start of spring 2016, a major winter storm moved through the High Plains and Midwest, bringing blizzard conditions with snowfall of up to  and strong winds as well. Snowstorms like this are typical in these areas at this time of year. The system also brought with it a severe weather threat as well. As it moved to the east, a crippling ice storm scenario was developing as well.

Meteorological history 

On March 21, an area of low pressure moved ashore on the West Coast, with a limited amount of moisture available. Because of this precipitation was originally isolated. As it moved westward on March 22 it started to intensify and as such snowfall began to become widespread. The storm also began to transition into an extratropical cyclone, achieving a peak of  two times on March 23. Blizzard warnings were issued for areas around Denver due to the strong winds accompanying the system along with snowfall. Parts of Interstate 80 were shut down due to the extreme winter weather conditions Ahead of its cold front, thunderstorms began to fire up, prompting the National Weather Service to issue a tornado watch. A squall line later developed out of this as more storms began to fire up and move eastwards, with the severe weather threat shifting more to the east towards the East Coast.

The massive system continued to trek to the east, as it began to push more into Canada, rather than the United States. An icing threat was also imminent as well. Part of Ontario were also impacted with significant freezing rain leading to significant ice accretion, the hardest hit area was that of Fergus, Ontario where there was roughly 1.4 inches (35 mm) of ice accretion. More ice accumulations were possible in New England, where freezing rain advisories were put into effect through March 25. The storm then started to rapidly weaken as it continued to move to the east, moved offshore late on March 25, then finally dissipated on March 26 while situated off Saint Pierre and Miquelon, however, its remaining cold front lingered across the South while transitioning into a stationary front, which flared up thunderstorm activity for the Easter weekend.

Impact

Snowfall totals 
The following list below are snowfall totals at or above .

Source:

References 

2016-3
2015–16 North American winter
2016 in North America
March 2016 events in the United States
2016 natural disasters in the United States
2016 disasters in Canada
Natural disasters in Colorado